Eunidia rufescens is a species of beetle in the family Cerambycidae. It was described by Breuning in 1939. It is known from Mozambique, Kenya, and South Africa. It contains the varietas Eunidia rufescens var. holatripes.

References

Eunidiini
Beetles described in 1939